The four-striped lipinia or black-striped slender tree skink (Lipinia quadrivittata) is a species of skink.

Distribution
Indonesia (Borneo, Celebes), Sunda Region (Borneo), Philippines (Palawan), Sula Islands, south Thailand (Bukit Besar, Patani states), and India

References

 Bauer, A.M.; Günther, R. & Klipfel, M. 1995 The herpetological contributions of Wilhelm C.H. Peters (1815-1883). SSAR Facsimile Reprints in Herpetology, 714 pp.

Lipinia
Reptiles of the Philippines
Taxa named by Wilhelm Peters
Reptiles described in 1867